Ubaldesco Baldi (13 July 1944 – 13 June 1991) was an Italian sport shooter who competed in the 1976 Summer Olympics, winning a bronze medal in the Mixed Trap event.

References

1944 births
1991 deaths
Italian male sport shooters
Trap and double trap shooters
Olympic shooters of Italy
Shooters at the 1976 Summer Olympics
Olympic bronze medalists for Italy
Olympic medalists in shooting
Medalists at the 1976 Summer Olympics
20th-century Italian people